John Preston Courville, known professionally as Johnny Preston (August 18, 1939 – March 4, 2011), was an American rock and roll singer, best known for his international number one hit in 1960, "Running Bear".

Life and career
Born in Port Arthur, Texas, of Cajun ancestry, Preston sang in high school choral contests throughout the state of Texas. He formed a rock and roll band called the Shades, who were seen performing at a local club by J. P. "The Big Bopper" Richardson.

Richardson offered Preston the chance to record a teenage tragedy song he had written, "Running Bear", which they did in Houston, Texas, in 1958. The "Indian" sounds on the record were performed by Richardson and George Jones. The record was released after the Big Bopper's death in the same plane crash that killed Buddy Holly and Ritchie Valens.
It entered the U.S. Billboard Hot 100 in October 1959, reaching number one in January 1960 and remaining there for three weeks. It was a transatlantic chart-topper, reaching #1 in the United Kingdom in March 1960. The sales of the record exceeded one million copies, earning Preston his first gold disc.

Preston quickly followed up with another hit called "Cradle of Love," (Billboard #7, UK # 2) and made several other records during the early 1960s that met with modest success. "Cradle of Love" was a hit in both the UK Singles Chart and in Athens, Greece. 
Preston's "I'm Starting to Go Steady", a song on the flip side of "Feel So Fine", (Billboard #14), was released in June 1960. Preston made appearances on American Bandstand (ABC-TV) and The Milt Grant Show and also The Buddy Deane Show (East Coast, United States).

Preston's pioneering contribution to the genre was recognized by the Rockabilly Hall of Fame. He also performed at Dick Clark's American Bandstand Theater in Branson, Missouri.

Preston had coronary artery bypass surgery in 2010. He died of heart failure in Beaumont, Texas, on March 4, 2011, at the age of 71, after years of heart-related illnesses. He was survived by his wife, Sharon, two sons and two daughters. Preston was buried at Oak Bluff Memorial Park in Port Neches, Texas. A tribute concert was performed on November 5, 2011, featuring guest artists Gene Bourgeois, Johnny Tillotson, Dickey Lee, and Chris Montez, along with LSCPS's Touring Band, under the direction of Aaron Horne.

Discography

Albums

Singles

See also
List of artists who reached number one in the United States
List of artists who reached number one on the UK Singles Chart
List of artists who reached number one on the Australian singles chart
List of stage names
List of Mercury Records artists

References

1939 births
2011 deaths
American male singers
American rock singers
People from Port Arthur, Texas
Gold Star Records artists
Imperial Records artists
Mercury Records artists
Cajun musicians